Simon Pellaud (born 6 November 1992) is a Swiss cyclist who currently rides for UCI ProTeam . He was named in the start-list for the 2015 Vuelta a España. In October 2020, he was named in the start-list for the 2020 Giro d'Italia.

Biography
Pellaud lives in Antioquia, Colombia.

Major results

2010
 1st Tour de Berne Juniors
2011
 7th Overall Grand Prix Chantal Biya
2013
 1st  Road race, National Under–23 Road Championships
 3rd Paris–Chauny
2014
 4th La Côte Picarde
2016
  Combativity award Stage 3 Vuelta a España
2017
 10th Overall Tour of Rwanda
1st Stage 2
2018
 1st Stage 9 Tour of Hainan
 2nd Overall Tour of Almaty
 4th Overall Tour of Romania
2019
 1st  Overall Tour de la Mirabelle
 1st  Mountains classification Tour de Romandie
 1st Flèche Ardennaise
 2nd Road race, National Road Championships
 3rd Overall Giro del Friuli-Venezia Giulia
 5th Tour du Doubs
 8th Overall Tour du Loir-et-Cher
1st Stage 1
2020
 3rd Road race, National Road Championships
2021
 1st Stage 8 Vuelta al Táchira
 2nd Road race, National Road Championships
 4th Gran Premio di Lugano

Grand Tour general classification results timeline

References

External links

1992 births
Living people
Swiss male cyclists
European Games competitors for Switzerland
Cyclists at the 2015 European Games
People from Locarno
Sportspeople from Ticino
21st-century Swiss people